Henri Bouchard (13 December 1875 – 30 November 1960), was a French sculptor. His work was part of the sculpture event in the art competition at the 1924 Summer Olympics.

Biography
The son of a carpenter, Bouchard was born in Dijon.  He was educated at the Académie Julian and in the studio of Louis-Ernest Barrias before entering the École nationale supérieure des Beaux-Arts in Paris.  He took the Prix de Rome in 1901.  His attention turned away from models from antiquity, and towards peasants, everyday life, and ordinary workers.  Bouchard himself became a professor at the Académie Julian in 1910.

In November 1941 Bouchard was one of a number of French painters and sculptors who accepted an official invitation from Joseph Goebbels for a grand tour of Nazi Germany.  Others who accepted the invitation were Charles Despiau, Paul Landowski, André Dunoyer de Segonzac, and Fauve artists Kees van Dongen, Maurice de Vlaminck, and André Derain.  On his return Bouchard had kind words about the status accorded artists in Nazi Germany.  Upon Liberation, in 1944, Bouchard was suspended from his professorship, branded a collaborator and ostracized by many former supporters.  He died in Paris.

The Musée Bouchard in Paris was opened in 1962 and closed in 2007, at the sculptor's former studio at 25 rue de l'Yvette.  Its collections, including a large figure of Apollo displayed at the Palais de Chaillot, plus over a thousand other works such as bronze casts, stone sculptures, and original plaster works, have been transferred to the Musée de La Piscine in Roubaix.  According to the museum's web site, a reconstruction of the studio was scheduled to open in 2010.

Work 
 symbols of the four evangelists, for the campanile of Basilique du Sacré-Cœur, Paris, 1911
 figure of the medieval sculptor Claus Sluter, 1911
 statues for the Reformation Wall in Geneva, executed with fellow French sculptor Paul Landowski, circa 1912
 monument to the children of Saint-Quentin (Aisne) in collaboration with the architect Paul Bigot and sculptor Paul Landowski, 1927
 Tombstone of Cardinal Louis-Ernest Dubois, Notre-Dame de Paris (1929)
 Christ on the Cross on the facade of the church of Saint-Martin, Chauny, France, circa 1930
 Boufarik colonization monument in French Algeria, 1930
 the tympanum of the church Saint Pierre de Chaillot in Paris, 1933–1935
 bronze Apollo for the Jardins du Trocadéro below the Palais de Chaillot, Paris, 1937
 the tombs of Albert Bartholomé, Gabriel Pierné and Général Grossetti, all in Père Lachaise Cemetery
 Inventor of the Bush hammer.

Sources 
 Musée Bouchard (Bouchard Museum)
 Association des Amis d'Henri Bouchard (Henri Bouchard friends non-profit corporation)

References

External links
 

1875 births
1960 deaths
Académie Julian alumni
Academic staff of the Académie Julian
French architectural sculptors
Prix de Rome for sculpture
Artists from Dijon
Members of the Académie des beaux-arts
20th-century French sculptors
20th-century French male artists
French male sculptors
Academic staff of the École des Beaux-Arts
Olympic competitors in art competitions